Michał Kopczyński (born 15 June 1992) is a Polish professional footballer who plays as a defensive midfielder or centre-back for Warta Poznań.

Club career
On 20 August 2020, he signed a two-year contract with Warta Poznań.

Career statistics

Club

1 Including Polish Super Cup.

Honours

Club
Legia Warszawa
 Ekstraklasa: 2012–13, 2013–14, 2015–16, 2016–17, 2017–18
 Polish Cup: 2012-13, 2015-16, 2017-18

References

External links
 
 

1992 births
People from Zamość
Sportspeople from Lublin Voivodeship
Living people
Polish footballers
Polish expatriate footballers
Association football midfielders
Legia Warsaw players
Wigry Suwałki players
Wellington Phoenix FC players
Arka Gdynia players
Warta Poznań players
Ekstraklasa players
A-League Men players
I liga players
III liga players
Polish expatriate sportspeople in Australia
Expatriate sportspeople in Australia